The Evolution Championship Series, commonly known as Evo, is an annual esports event that focuses exclusively on fighting games. The tournaments are completely open and use the double elimination format. As with Super Battle Opera, contestants travel from all over the world to participate, most notably from Japan. The first Evolution was originally held as a Super Street Fighter II Turbo and Street Fighter Alpha 2 tournament called the Battle by the Bay. It changed its name to Evo in 2002. Every successive tournament has seen an increase of attendees. It has been held at various venues across the Las Vegas Valley since 2005. As of 2021, the event is jointly owned by Sony Interactive Entertainment and the Endeavor esports venture RTS.

History
Evo was founded by Tom Cannon, also known for his work on Shoryuken.com, a fighting game website. The tournament started as "Battle by the Bay", a 40-man Super Street Fighter II Turbo and Street Fighter Alpha 2 tournament in 1996 in Sunnyvale, California. The event eventually moved to its recurring venue in the Las Vegas Valley. The event changed its name to Evolution Championship Series, or EVO for short, in 2002. Over time, the tournament grew, recording over one thousand participants in 2009.

Originally the tournament used arcade cabinets, but in 2004 the decision was made to move all games over to their console versions, to a large amount of controversy. During the transition to games on the seventh generation consoles, most games were played on a PlayStation 3, though Evo 2014 ran most games on the Xbox 360. Aside from the official tournaments, there is also a "BYOC" ("bring your own console") area in which many different games are played and side tournaments are held.

1996–2003: Tournament beginnings and re-branding

B3: Battle by the Bay was organized by Tom "inkblot" Cannon, Tony "Ponder" Cannon, Joey "MrWizard" Cuellar, and Seth "S-Kill" Killian, and held in the Golfland arcade hall in Sunnyvale, California. The tournament had 40 contenders mostly from the United States, though B3 also featured players from Canada and Kuwait. B3 featured a Super Street Fighter II Turbo and Street Fighter Alpha 2 tournament.

The B4 Street Fighter Championships were held on July 15–16, 2000, in Folsom, California. B4 introduced several new Capcom fighting games to the roster: Street Fighter Alpha 3, Street Fighter III: 3rd Strike, and Marvel vs. Capcom 2: New Age of Heroes. The newly released Marvel vs. Capcom 2 was the first non-Street Fighter game to be included, and a precedent for the tournament to branch out to other games. The Capcom Versus series has since had a large presence in the Battle of the Bay and Evolution Championship Series events.

Held in August 2001 in Folsom, California, the B5 Championships was attended by a much larger international crowd, particularly from Japan. Capcom vs. SNK: Millennium Fight 2000 made its introduction in the tournament roster at B5, and Marvel vs. Capcom 2 was again a headliner of the event, being described by TechTV as "the hottest arcade fighting game of the season."

In 2002, the event became formally known as its current name, "Evo". Evo 2002 took place on August 9, 2002, at the University of California, Los Angeles.

2004–08: Change to consoles, Moment 37 and EVO Circuit
Evo 2004 took place at California State Polytechnic University, Pomona in Southern California from July 29 to August 1. The tournament amassed approximately 700 competitors from over 30 countries to compete in over nine different games. The games featured included Super Street Fighter II Turbo, Street Fighter III: 3rd Strike, Marvel vs. Capcom 2, Capcom vs. SNK 2, Virtua Fighter 4: Evolution, Guilty Gear XX, Soulcalibur II, Tekken 4, and Tekken Tag Tournament.

Evo 2004 used home consoles for most of their tournament games instead of arcade cabinets, with the only exception being 3rd Strike which used the more traditional arcade cabinets. Evo 2004 was the birthplace of "Evo Moment #37". During the Street Fighter III: 3rd Strike tournament, Daigo Umehara (playing as Ken), while facing Justin Wong (using Chun-Li), successfully parried one of Chun-Li's "Super Moves" while having very little health left and then countered with his own, winning the match. This highlight became highly influential within the fighting game community.

2005 was the first year Evo was held at the Green Valley Ranch casino and hotel in Las Vegas.

Evo 2006 took place at the Red Rock Resort Spa and Casino in Las Vegas. 2006 was the first year that Capcom gave its official, public support of the Evolution tournaments. Traditionally, Evo has only included fighting games, but in 2006 it included Mario Kart DS in its lineup. The other games featured were Dead or Alive 4, Guilty Gear XX Slash, and Hyper Street Fighter II.

Evo 2007, officially called Evo World 2007, took place from August 24 to 26 at the Green Valley Ranch, in Las Vegas. Throughout the year there were several other tournaments held throughout the US bearing the Evo name. The game roster had eight games, Street Fighter III: 3rd Strike, Capcom vs. SNK 2, Virtua Fighter 5, Marvel vs. Capcom 2, Street Fighter II Turbo, Tekken 5: Dark Resurrection, Guilty Gear XX Λ Core, and Super Smash Bros. Melee.

Evo 2008 took place at the Tropicana Las Vegas on the Las Vegas Strip. from August 8 to 10. The tournament would feature six games within its official roster: Capcom vs. SNK 2, Tekken 5: Dark Resurrection, Street Fighter III: 3rd Strike, Super Smash Bros. Brawl, Super Street Fighter II Turbo, and Marvel vs. Capcom 2. The Brawl tournament was widely criticized for its ruleset, which allowed items on and saw a relatively unknown player defeat Ken Hoang.

Evo 2008 also allowed attendees a preview of BlazBlue: Calamity Trigger, Street Fighter IV, Super Street Fighter II Turbo HD Remix, and Tatsunoko vs. Capcom.

2009–13: Street Fighter IV, live streams, and record numbers

Evo 2009 took place on July 17 to 19. Held at the Rio Convention Center, in Las Vegas, Nevada, the tournament itself would feature six games on its official roster: Soulcalibur IV, Guilty Gear XX: Accent Core, Marvel vs. Capcom 2, Street Fighter III: 3rd Strike, Super Street Fighter II Turbo HD Remix and Street Fighter IV. Notably, the newly released Street Fighter IV increased Evo attendance by a considerable margin, and the tournament for it alone boasted more than 1000 participants, almost three times that of the tournaments for the other games.

Evo 2010, held at Caesars Palace from July 9, 2010 through July 11, 2010 had a massive number of competitors, with Super Street Fighter IV amassing approximately 1,800 players to duel for a $20,000 guaranteed prize pot. Most notable in this EVO was Justin Wong cementing his dominance in Marvel vs. Capcom 2 in its proverbial swan song, defeating the champion of the previous year, Sanford Kelly. Also notable was Wong failing to make the top 8 in Super Street Fighter IV, falling victim first to Vance "Vangief" Wu, and soon after to Taiwanese player Bruce "GamerBee" Hsiang. Melty Blood: Actress Again was included after a poll on Shoryuken.com to decide on the final game of the tournament, beating out Street Fighter III: 3rd Strike, Capcom vs. SNK 2, Marvel vs. Capcom 2, Soulcalibur IV, and The King of Fighters XII. BlazBlue: Calamity Trigger was to be included, but after a majority of the community moved on to BlazBlue: Continuum Shift, the decision was made to replace it with Marvel vs. Capcom 2. Also notable was G4's limited coverage of the event, even offering X-Play host Adam Sessler for commentary of the Super Street Fighter IV finals.

For Evo 2011, a tournament season was announced in which players could earn ranking points at one of eight tournaments. It took place at the Rio All Suite Hotel and Casino from July 29 to 31, utilizing a  ballroom. All 50 states of the U.S. were represented, as well as 44 additional countries. Its livestream was watched by over 2 million unique viewers on UStream over the course of the event.

In attendance was Street Fighter series producer Ono Yoshinori, who announced a free balance patch for Super Street Fighter IV Arcade Edition. Tekken series producer Katsuhiro Harada was also on hand to show new mechanics for Tekken Tag Tournament 2 and Soulcalibur V. Other unreleased games shown were Ultimate Marvel vs. Capcom 3, King of Fighters XIII, Skullgirls and Street Fighter III: 3rd Strike Online Edition. A Skullgirls side tournament was held in which the winner received a one-of-a-kind Skullgirls-themed arcade stick. Media outlets G4, GameSpot and Destructoid were all present to cover the event.

Evo 2012 took place July 6 to 8, 2012, at Caesars Palace, Las Vegas. On January 3, Joey Cuellar announced that Evo 2012 would have 6 main tournament games, Super Street Fighter IV: Arcade Edition (Version 2012), Ultimate Marvel vs. Capcom 3, Mortal Kombat, Soulcalibur V, The King of Fighters XIII and Street Fighter X Tekken. The tournament series from the previous year returned, featuring seeding points for all six games in 17 events all across the world.

Evo 2013 was announced on December 2, 2012. It was held on July 12–14 at Paris Las Vegas. On January 8, Joey Cuellar announced that EVO 2013 would have eight main tournament games, with the first seven revealed being Ultimate Marvel vs. Capcom 3, Super Street Fighter IV: Arcade Edition (Version 2012), Tekken Tag Tournament 2, Mortal Kombat, Street Fighter X Tekken (Version 2013), The King of Fighters XIII, and Persona 4 Arena. The eighth game was voted on by players via online donations, all proceeds of which went to the Breast Cancer Research Foundation. The eventual winner of the poll was Super Smash Bros. Melee with $94,683 raised for that game, while the total amount of donations was $225,744. Nintendo of America initially sent a cease and desist letter to cancel the streaming of Melee matches, although after popular backlash a live stream was ultimately allowed to be carried out as planned. On May 7, 2013, it was announced that Injustice: Gods Among Us would be a main tournament game, thus expanding the game roster from eight to nine.

2014–19: Smash boom and international growth
Evo 2014 was announced on September 15, 2013. It was held on July 11–13, 2014 at the Westgate Las Vegas Resort & Casino On February 6, 2014, Cuellar announced that Evo 2014 would include BlazBlue: Chrono Phantasma, Ultimate Marvel vs. Capcom 3, Injustice: Gods Among Us, The King of Fighters XIII, Killer Instinct, and Ultra Street Fighter IV while also mentioning that discussions were ongoing with Nintendo on the possible inclusion of Super Smash Bros. Melee. Melee was eventually officially added to the roster with Nintendo's approval. Tekken Tag Tournament 2 was also later added to the roster.

Evo 2015 took place on July 17–19, 2015 at the Bally's / Paris Las Vegas Casino. On January 20, 2015, Cuellar announced that Evo 2015 would include Guilty Gear Xrd -SIGN-, Ultimate Marvel vs. Capcom 3, Super Smash Bros. for Wii U, Killer Instinct, Mortal Kombat X, Persona 4 Arena Ultimax, Ultra Street Fighter IV, Super Smash Bros. Melee, and Tekken 7.

While EVO 2015 initially was supposed to run on the PlayStation 4 version for Ultra Street Fighter IV, the tournament instead used the Xbox 360 version, due to a large number of bugs and glitches found by players in the newly released port. Cuellar also confirmed that EVO 2015 would use the technically outdated build of Persona 4 Arena Ultimax on PlayStation 3. On May 25, Cuellar confirmed that both Super Smash Bros. Melee and Super Smash Bros. for Wii U surpassed 1,500 entrants each. Cuellar later confirmed that Ultra Street Fighter IV surpassed 2,000 entrants. EVO 2015 also acted as a Capcom Cup qualifier for Ultra Street Fighter IV, as well as a Killer Instinct World Cup qualifier for Killer Instinct, with both games receiving respective bonus pots of $50,000 from Capcom/Sony and Iron Galaxy/Microsoft respectively. NetherRealm and Warner Bros. have also donated $50K towards the bonus pot for Mortal Kombat X, due to the success of the Blue Steel Sub-Zero skin. In addition, Atlus has donated $10K towards the bonus pot for Persona 4 Arena Ultimax, while Arc System Works and Aksys Games donated the same amount to the bonus pot for Guilty Gear Xrd. Bandai Namco has announced that they have provided a $30K bonus pot for Tekken 7 as well as providing all competitors in said game an exclusive T-shirt featuring franchise veteran Lili and Tekken Revolution newcomer Eliza.

Evo 2016 took place from July 15–17 at the Las Vegas Convention Center, while Sunday finals took take place at the Mandalay Bay Events Center. The tournament featured Guilty Gear Xrd -REVELATOR-, Street Fighter V, Super Smash Bros. Melee, Super Smash Bros. for Wii U, Mortal Kombat XL, Pokkén Tournament, Killer Instinct, Ultimate Marvel vs. Capcom 3, and Tekken 7: Fated Retribution. The tournaments for Street Fighter V, Super Smash Bros. Melee, Guilty Gear Xrd -REVELATOR-, Ultimate Marvel vs. Capcom 3, and Mortal Kombat XL finished on Sunday. The finals for Street Fighter V was broadcast live on ESPN2 and live coverage of the tournament was available through ESPN's WatchESPN service, in addition to the tournament's regular Twitch streams.

Joey Cuellar has announced record breaking numbers which includes Street Fighter V reaching more than 5,000 entrants, Smash 4 and Melee each reaching more than 2,000; Pokkén reaching more than 1,000 entrants while other games either increased or decreased. Like EVO 2015's Ultra Street Fighter IV finals, Capcom and Sony have provided a $50,000 bonus pot towards Street Fighter V's prize pool and is also a Capcom Pro Tour qualifier. The Pokémon Company has announced a $10,000 bonus pot towards Pokkén Tournament's prize pool and is a Pokkén Tournament Championship Series qualifier, with 1st and 2nd place being able to qualify for the finals. As with EVO 2015, NetherRealm and Warner Bros. have provided a $50,000 bonus pot towards Mortal Kombat XL's prize pool. Killer Instinct will be receiving a $15,000 bonus pot as part of the KI Ultra Tour funding. On July 11, Aksys Games announced a $10,000 bonus pot towards Guilty Gear Xrd -REVELATOR-'s prize pool.

Evo 2017 took place on July 14 to 16 with the entire event being held at the Mandalay Bay resort. The tournament featured Guilty Gear Xrd REV2, BlazBlue: Central Fiction, Super Smash Bros. for Wii U, Super Smash Bros. Melee, Injustice 2, Street Fighter V, Tekken 7, The King of Fighters XIV, and Ultimate Marvel vs. Capcom 3. The ninth game was chosen by a donation drive which all of the funds have gone towards Make-A-Wish International. Ultimate Marvel vs. Capcom 3 was the winning game with Pokkén Tournament being the runner-up. Other games in contention were Skullgirls: 2nd Encore, ARMS, Mortal Kombat XL, Nidhogg, Windjammers, Killer Instinct, and Super Street Fighter II Turbo. The Sunday finals included Ultimate Marvel vs. Capcom 3 (as the opening game), BlazBlue: Central Fiction, Tekken 7, Super Smash Bros. for Wii U, and Street Fighter V. Upon the victory of UMvC3, Cuellar announced that Evo 2017 would be running the event with the PlayStation 4 version being used.

Evo 2018 took place on August 3 to 5 with the entire event being held at the Mandalay Bay resort. The tournament featured Street Fighter V: Arcade Edition, Tekken 7, Super Smash Bros. for Wii U, Super Smash Bros. Melee, BlazBlue: Cross Tag Battle, Guilty Gear Xrd REV2, Injustice 2, and Dragon Ball FighterZ.

Evo 2019 took place on August 2 to 4 with the entire event being held at the Mandalay Bay resort. The tournament featured Street Fighter V: Arcade Edition, Tekken 7, Super Smash Bros. Ultimate, Mortal Kombat 11, Soulcalibur VI, Under Night In-Birth Exe:Late[st], Dragon Ball FighterZ, BlazBlue Cross Tag Battle, and Samurai Shodown.

2020–present: COVID-19 cancellation and new ownership
Evo 2020 was to have taken place from July 31 to August 2 at the Mandalay Bay resort. However, due to the COVID-19 pandemic, the physical event had been cancelled, with all event and hotel reservations to be refunded. Online tournament events had been scheduled from July 4 to August 2 as replacement activities. However, at the start of July 2020, charges of sexual misconduct were leveled at EVO CEO Joey Cuellar. The EVO board released Cuellar on July 2 and replaced him with Tony Cannon as interim CEO but by then, several publishers including Capcom, Bandai Namco, NetherRealm, and Mane6 had decided to pull out from the event. The EVO board decided to cancel the event, refund those tickets and donate the remaining funds to Project HOPE.

On March 18, 2021, it was announced that Evo had been acquired by a joint venture between Sony Interactive Entertainment and the talent agency Endeavor (RTS). It was concurrently announced that Evo Online 2021 will be held August 6–8 and August 13–15, 2021, and feature Guilty Gear Strive, Mortal Kombat 11 Ultimate, Street Fighter V: Champion Edition, Tekken 7, and Skullgirls: 2nd Encore. Evo stated that the Sony ownership of the competition will not affect its ability to include events for non-PlayStation games, although all games in the 2021 lineup are either available on, or console-exclusive to, PlayStation.

Evo 2022 took place from August 5 to 7 at the Mandalay Bay resort. The event is the first since 2019 to take place in-person due to the COVID-19 pandemic. The tournament featured Dragon Ball FighterZ, Granblue Fantasy: Versus, Guilty Gear Strive, The King of Fighters XV, Melty Blood: Type Lumina, Mortal Kombat 11 Ultimate, Skullgirls: 2nd Encore, Street Fighter V: Champion Edition, and Tekken 7.

Evo 2023 was announced for August 4 to 6, with Street Fighter 6, Guilty Gear Strive, Dragon Ball FighterZ, The King of Fighters XV, Melty Blood: Type Lumina, Mortal Kombat 11 Ultimate and Tekken 7 all being featured. Ultimate Marvel vs. Capcom 3 was also announced as the eighth game of the lineup, serving to launch a new category dubbed a Throwback Tournament. The event also underwent a format change, with finals switching from Top 8 to Top 6, seemingly due to runtime concerns.

Evo Japan

In 2010, the Evolution Championship organizers announced an official spin-off to the tournament series called "Evo vs Godsgarden", to be held in Japan the following year. However, the tournament was called off following the Tohoku earthquake and postponed indefinitely. During a Nico Nico livestream following Evo 2013, Cuellar stated that he was still interested in holding a Japan-based tournament.

It was announced at Evo 2016 that a separate event simply titled "Evo Japan" is to be held in Japan. During a presentation at the Tokyo Game Show in 2016, the Evolution organizers announced that the tournament is to be held in January 2018, while some form of "pre-tournament" took place in 2017.

At Evo 2017, the Evo Japan 2018 lineup was revealed to consist of Street Fighter V, Guilty Gear Xrd REV 2, Tekken 7, Super Smash Bros. for Wii U, BlazBlue: Central Fiction, The King of Fighters XIV, and ARMS; the event took place from January 26 to 28. The lineup is known to emphasize titles that are popular in Japan, as titles such as Super Smash Bros. Melee, Injustice 2, and Marvel vs. Capcom: Infinite are notably absent mostly due to their lack of popularity in the region.

Despite the 7,000 entrants, Evo Japan ended up reporting a $1.13m loss according to financial reports by Hearts United Group.

Evo Japan 2019 was held in February 2019.

In October 2019, it was revealed that Super Smash Bros. Ultimate would be the headlining game for Evo Japan 2020.

Following EVO 2022, the EVO Japan 2023 tournament was unveiled. This will have a lineup of Guilty Gear Strive, Street Fighter V, Tekken 7, The King of Fighters XV,  Granblue Fantasy: Versus, Melty Blood: Type Lumina, and Virtua Fighter 5 Ultimate Showdown. The event will take place in March 2023.

Champions

References

External links
 

 
1996 establishments in California
Annual events in Nevada
Nintendo events
Recurring events established in 1996
Super Smash Bros. tournaments
2021 mergers and acquisitions
Sony Interactive Entertainment
Joint ventures